Benjamin de Almeida Sodré, commonly known as Benjamin Sodré or as Mimi Sodré (April 10, 1892 – February 1, 1982) was a Brazilian scout and football striker, who played for the Brazil national team.

Career
Born in Belém, Mimi Sodré started his career in 1908, defending Botafogo, leaving the club in 1916. He returned to play for Botafogo in 1922.

National team
He played two games for the Brazil national team in 1916. He played his first game on July 12 against Uruguay, playing against that country again on July 18, scoring a goal in that game.

President of Botafogo
Mimi Sodré was president of Botafogo Football Club in 1941. Botafogo Football Club was one of the two clubs that fused to form Botafogo de Futebol e Regatas in 1942.

Scouting
Mimi Sodré was a student at the Naval Academy when after reading a book by Baden Powell named Scouting for Boys, he became interested in Scouting. Sodré, under the pen name Velho Lobo, published a Scouting book named Guia do Escoteiro. During his life he was a member of the União dos Escoteiros do Brasil, led several Scouting groups, and taught several courses around his country.

See also
List of Brazilian footballers

References

1892 births
1982 deaths
Sportspeople from Belém
Brazilian footballers
Botafogo de Futebol e Regatas players
Brazil international footballers
Brazilian football chairmen and investors
Scouting and Guiding in Brazil
Brazilian admirals
Association football forwards